The Great White is a sit-down wooden/steel roller coaster made and built by Custom Coasters International.

It has been operating since June 10, 1996 and has 2 trains from the Philadelphia Toboggan Company with 6 cars per train. Riders are arranged 2 across in 2 rows for a total of 24 riders per train. 

The ride starts by dropping into a tunnel beneath the boardwalk. After exiting the tunnel, the ride climbs up the 110-foot lift hill before dropping 100 feet at a 50-degree-angle, reaching a maximum speed of 50 mph (80 km/h). The ride then goes off the boardwalk and towards the beach, entering an elevated 225° swooping turn over the beach. The track then dives down into a turning drop, rising up to a flat 225° turn around. Another diving and swooping turn brings the train parallel to the first turn, and thence parallel to the lift hill. A series of three short airtime hills provide strong pops of ejector airtime, before rising up into a double-up into another flat turn around. The train makes one final turning drop and 90° before entering the brake run perpendicular to the lift hill and station. 

This ride was built over the beach because Morey's Piers ran out of room on the pier. This ride is being constantly checked out by inspectors and has its track replaced frequently. This is one of the three 100+ feet coasters at Morey's and the only one that is a hybrid coaster. The ride has been retracked by Martin & Vleminckx.

For 2021, the coaster received 240 feet of new track, a new ride control system, and an elevator in the station.

References

Further reading
 Fun Pier: 1957 to Adventure Pier - Scott Hand, Diane Pooler - Google Books
 Road Trip USA: Cross-Country Adventures on America's Two-Lane Highways - Jamie Jensen - Google Books
 Roller Coasters - Mike Schafer - Google Books
 Roller Coasters: United States and Canada - Todd H. Throgmorton - Google Books

External links
 "The Great White." Morey's Piers & Beachfront Waterparks

Great White
Roller coasters introduced in 1996
Morey's Piers